Shalamzar (also Romanized as Shalamzār) is a city in the Central District of Kiar County, Chaharmahal and Bakhtiari province, Iran, and serves as capital of the county. At the 2006 census, its population was 7,003 in 1,671 households, when it was one of two cities in the former Kiar District of Shahrekord County. The following census in 2011 counted 7,132 people in 1,965 households, by which time the city became the capital of the newly established Kiar County. The latest census in 2016 showed a population of 6,899 people in 2,116 households. The city is populated by Lurs.

References 

Kiar County

Cities in Chaharmahal and Bakhtiari Province

Populated places in Chaharmahal and Bakhtiari Province

Populated places in Kiar County

Luri settlements in Chaharmahal and Bakhtiari Province